Trechus maqenicus is a species of ground beetle in the subfamily Trechinae. It was described by Deuve in 2004.

References

maqenicus
Beetles described in 2004